Saku is a small town in Harju County, Estonia, located  south from Tallinn, the capital. It is the administrative centre of Saku Parish. Saku had a population of 4,675 on 1 April 2012, which makes it the biggest small town in Estonia.

Saku is most known for the Saku Brewery which is one of two biggest breweries in Estonia.

It has a railway station on the Tallinn - Viljandi railway line operated by Elron (rail transit). The Vääna River crosses Saku.

Saku Manor
Saku Manor traces its history back to 1463. The current manor house was built in 1825-1830 in a neoclassical style, and is possibly designed by the renowned St. Petersburg architect Carlo Rossi. It is one of the finest examples, perhaps the finest, of a neoclassical manor house in Estonia.

Notable people
Evelin Ilves (born 1968), former First Lady of Estonia, grew up in Saku.
Juss Laansoo (born 1983), motocross rider
Grit Šadeiko (born 1989), heptathlete, was born in Saku.
Jaak Urmet (pseudonym Wimberg; born 1979), writer, was born in Saku.

See also
List of palaces and manor houses in Estonia

References

External links

Saku Parish
Saku Manor
Saku Manor in Estonian Manors Portal
Saku Brewery
AS Saku Maja 
Saku Gymnasium 

Manor houses in Estonia
Kreis Harrien
Boroughs and small boroughs in Estonia